5T was a Vietnamese crime gang active in the Cabramatta and Bankstown area of Sydney, Australia, with sub-groups and ex-members living interstate, in the final two decades of the 20th century.

Their main local rivals were the 1N and 7A gangs and the three constantly fought each other for territory.

The rise of 5T
The 5T gang was started by Cabramatta youths who came to Australia with their parents after the fall of the Republic of Vietnam. The formation of the 5Ts began in the mid-1980s. The term '5T', stands for five Vietnamese words starting with 'T'; 'Tình', 'Tiền', 'Tù', 'Tội' and 'Tử', translating to 'Love, Money, Prison, Sin, and Death'. However, 5T also means 'tuổi trẻ thiếu tình thương' which roughly translates to 'childhood without love.'

Gang members apparently were tattooed with the emblem consisting of a straight horizontal line and 5 joined vertical lines with members' first and family names starting with the letter T being the horizontal line on top of the name.

Tri Minh Tran 
Tri Minh Tran rose to leadership of the 5T gang by the age of 14 in 1989. Born in Vietnam in 1975, Tran arrived in Australia at age 7 as a refugee. By age 11, he had spent six months in a children's institution for carrying a sawn-off shotgun and in the next few years was suspected of the murder of two rival gang members.

5T and heroin trade 
The 5T gang dominated the Cabramatta heroin trade, predominantly at a street level. In January 1988, the Sydney Morning Herald warned, "Criminal gangs in the Vietnamese community are increasingly heavily armed, are moving into drugs and gambling, establishing links with Australian crime figures, and becoming involved in standover rackets in their own community".

John Newman first warned of the Vietnamese gangs including the 5T in 1989 in NSW State Parliament, saying, "The Asian gangs involved don't fear our laws. But there's one thing they do fear and that's possible deportation back to the jungles of Vietnam, because that's where, frankly, they belong."  Newman campaigned strongly against the crime gangs in Vietnam and received regular death threats before his murder.

Disbandment
The murder of Tran in 1995 sparked a power struggle within the organization. This was ultimately furthered with the death of the 5T successor. This led to an escalation of violence in 1999, as rival mobs, the 'Four Aces' and 'Madonna's boys', which were break-away groups of the 5T, challenged the 5T leading to an increase in the murder rate in Cabramatta. This gang warfare eventually led to the NSW Parliament establishing a Parliamentary Inquiry.

During this inquiry in 2001, Tim Priest, a police officer based at Cabramatta warned of an upsurge of gang violence in Southwestern Sydney including Vietnamese, Chinese and Middle Eastern gangs. He was criticised for his comments by then NSW Education Minister John Aquilina and Reba Meagher, Newman's successor as Member for Cabramatta, who labelled him a "disgruntled detective" before being forced to apologise.

The successors of the 5T included the Four Aces, Red Dragon and Madonna's Boys (Madonna) [Ro Van Le]. The leader and namesake of the gang, however, was subsequently murdered outside a Western Sydney pub in 1999 shortly after being released from prison, subsequently leading to the eventual demise of the 5T Gang.

References

1985 establishments in Australia
Organizations established in 1985
Gangs in Australia
Vietnamese gangs
Street gangs
Organised crime in Sydney